Werner Pöhlert (September 30, 1928, to September 30, 2000) was jazz guitarist and author born in Hamburg, Germany.  He was voted best German jazz guitarist in 1956.  At that time, he was a member of the Wolfgang Lauth Quartet. He also collaborated with Hans Reffert and was a guitarist in the Werner Pöhlert Combo, along with his son Jochen Pöhlert.  Pöhlert worked as a university lecturer.

Written works 
 Basic Harmony, 1983, 
 Der Dauerquintfall: seine Erklärung durch die Quintfall-Drehscheibe auf Basis der Grundlagenharmonik. Grundlagen zur Improvisation und Komposition, zum Begleiten und Liedermachen (mit Jochen Schulte), 1984, 
 Schule für authentisches Jazz-Piano & Keyboard. Moderne Grundlagentechniken auf Basis der Pöhlertschen Grundlagenharmonik, 1991, 
 Analyse der Skalen"theorie" auf Basis der Pöhlertschen Grundlagenharmonik, Zimmermann, 
 Pöhlert's Gitarre Pages, Zimmermann, 1994, 
 Pöhlert's Baß Pages, Schimper, 1995, 
 Pöhlert's Piano & Keyboard Pages, Schimper, 1996, 
 Basic Mediantic., Blues Mediantic, Schimper, 
 Grundlagenharmonik und grundlagenharmonisches Denken, Zimmermann,

External links 
 
 Werner Pöhlert im Deutschen Musikarchiv

1928 births
2000 deaths
German jazz guitarists
German male guitarists
German male writers
20th-century German musicians
20th-century guitarists
20th-century German male musicians
German male jazz musicians